Oberleitner is a German language habitational surname. Notable people with the name include:
 Franz Xaver Oberleitner (1789–1832), Austrian theologian and orientalist
 Karin Oberleitner (born 1968), Austrian former professional tennis player
 Markus Oberleitner (born 1973), German footballer
 Michael Oberleitner (born 1966), Austrian tennis coach and former professional player
 Neil Oberleitner (born 1999), Austrian tennis player

References 

German-language surnames
German toponymic surnames
Surnames of Austrian origin